The 2011-12 LEN Women's Champions' Cup is the ongoing 25th edition of LEN's competition for women's water polo national champion clubs. Thirteen teams from England, France, Germany, Greece, Italy, Russia, Serbia and Spain entered the competition.

Pro Recco defeated Vouliagmeni 8–7 in the final to win the competition for the first time. Kinef Kirishi and Orizzonte Catania also reached the Final Four, with the Russians hosting the stage. Defending champion CN Sabadell was defeated by Vouliagmeni in the quarter-finals.

Group stage

Group A

Group B

Quarter-finals

Final four
 Kirishi, Russia

References

LEN Euro League Women seasons
Women, Euro League
Champions Cup
Champions Cup
LEN
LEN